The Red de Innovación y Aprendizaje (RIA), or Learning and Innovation Network, is a group of education centers that offer members of underserved communities in Mexico access to computers, the Internet and quality education. The RIA is overseen by Fundación Proacceso, a Mexico-based non-profit organization focused on using technology as a tool for education.

Background 
The first RIA center was inaugurated on May 18, 2009, and since then over 68,000 users have registered at its ten centers. Thirty-two new RIA centers will open by the end of January 2011, bringing the network to a total of 42 centers.

The RIA offers courses on basic computer and Internet skills, English, finding work through the Internet, math and science workshops for children, personal finance and more. Students can also obtain their high school, bachelor’s and master’s degrees at the RIA through the Institute of Online education. Courses are taught by qualified facilitators, many of whom are residents of the local communities that the RIA targets.

References

External links
 Fundación Proacceso ECO
 Página oficial RIA
 México ¡bravo!, 3 de junio de 2010.
 La tecnología apoya a la educación, CNN Expansion, 24 de diciembre de 2009
 Combaten brecha digital en Edomex, 1ero de septiembre de 2010
Usan red para innovar y aprender, "Ediciones Impresas Milenio"
Centros comunitarios tecnológicos ponen educación a la disposición de todos, "Publimetro" 29 Agosto de 2010.
El Universal Edo. México, 1 de septiembre de 2010
RIA comienza a cerrar brecha digital en México, 31 de agosto de 2010
RIA con apertura de nuevos centros tecnológicos, 18 de octubre de 2010
Tyco Electronics colabora con infraestructura dentro del proyecto RIA´s 7 de Julio de 2009
Fundación Proacceso y RIA por un México digital, 8 de octubre de 2010
RIA abre 8 centros nuevos para capacitación tecnológica 19 de octubre de 2010
Abre en Texcoco centro de enseñanza de tecnologías de vanguardia 12 de diciembre 2010
Respaldan el trabajo de la Red de Innovación y Aprendizaje 20 de septiembre de 2010
Jaime Camil apoya a RIAeco
Obligada la enseñanza digital "El Sol de Toluca", 15 de Mayo de 2010
La RIA será sede del festival Ambultante 2011 en el Edo. México 15 de febrero de 2011
Endeavour encuentra a 12 Emprendedores de Alto Impacto 18 de Noviembre de 2010
Niños podrán aprender a través de Internet 13 de diciembre de 2010
Una tesis convertida a empresa
RIA promueve el acceso a las nuevas tecnologías de la información a los niños mexicanos Educared

Non-profit organizations based in Mexico